Jane Franklin (1791–1875) was a London-born Tasmanian adventuress.

Jane Franklin may also refer to:

People
Jane Franklin Mecom (1712–1794), youngest sister of Benjamin Franklin
Jane Franklin Hommel (1878–1946), suffragette from Tennessee
Jane Franklin (cricketer) (born 1974), cricketer from Victoria, Australia
Jane Franklin (author), American historian focusing on Cuba-U.S. relations

Organizations
Jane Franklin Hall, a residential college of the University of Tasmania